Senator Neumann may refer to:

Henry Neumann (born 1950), Senate of Puerto Rico
Paul Neumann (Attorney General) (1839–1901), California State Senate

See also
Senator Newman (disambiguation)